The 3rd Supply Battalion is a battalion of the United States Marine Corps that specializes in distributing and warehousing military goods and equipment. They are headquartered at Camp Kinser, with their most remote company of Marines, Ammunition Company, located 37 miles north of Camp Kinser aboard Camp Schwab near the town of Henoko, Okinawa, Japan and fall under the command of  the 3rd Marine Logistics Group.

Subordinate units
 Headquarters and Service Company
 Ammunition Company
 Medical Logistics Company
 Supply Company
 Combat Logistics Company 36

History

References

 3rd Supply Battalion's official website

Logistics battalions of the United States Marine Corps